Yuri Hasenko  (1894 – † 1933, Paris) was a Ukrainian statesman and public figure, writer and journalist, diplomat. He was member of the Union of Ukrainian Journalists and Writers in Vienna.

Professional career and experience 

In 1917 – he was personal Adjutant General Secretary of Military Affairs Symon Petliura. The following year – a member of the Ukrainian delegation at the peace negotiations in Brest. 14 December 1917, General Secretariat of the Ukrainian People's Republic issued mandate to Yuri Hasenko to perform special mission abroad. He managed to carry out a number of important events of diplomatic and intelligence character in Vienna, Berlin, Paris, London, Rome, Washington and some other capitals. In 1919–1920 – he was associate Ukrainian Embassy in Romania. Then in exile in Germany and Czechoslovakia.
On 11 March 1920 – he was chairman of the Ukrainian national flying club in Vienna.

Authored works 

 Ist Cholmland polnisch oder ukrainisch? Lausanne, 1918 (Le Pays du Cholm. Est il polonais ou ukrainien? Lausanne, 1918).
 Les Etats-Unis de la Mer Noire. Vienne-Bucarest, 1918.
 Feuille à ajouter au Dictionnaire encyclopédique Larousse, page 1630, au mot Ukraine d'après les dernières données de la science. Bucarest, 1919.
 A qui doit appartenir la Bucovine? (1919)
 La République Ukrainienne, son histoire, sa géographie et sa vie économique. Bucarest, 1919 (Republica Ucrainiasǎ. Teritoriul, populaţia, viaţa economicǎ. București, 1919).
 Die Ukraina in ihren ethnographischen Grenzen. Wien, [o.J.] 
 L'Ukraine, carte comparative géographique, écomomique, étnographique. Bucarest, 1919 
 The Republic of Ukraine (1919)

References

External links 
 The centre of defence intelligence history.
 The history of Ukraine's modern foreign service
 Encyclopedia of Ukraine. Edited by Volodymyr Kubijovyc. Paris—New-York, 1955

1894 births
1933 deaths
Ambassadors of Ukraine to Romania
People from Kislovodsk
20th-century Ukrainian inventors
Ukrainian people of World War I
20th-century Ukrainian journalists